Chestnut Ridge Senior High School is a small, rural public, comprehensive high school located in the Chestnut Ridge region of Bedford County, Pennsylvania. In 2015, enrollment was 639 pupils in grades 8th through 12th. Chestnut Ridge Senior High School is the only high school in the Chestnut Ridge School District.

The school campus was constructed in 1972 and last renovated in 2007, adding a new Cafeteria, Science and Technology Wing, and a Band Room addition, as well as renovations to the existing structure.

Extracurriculars
Chestnut Ridge School District offers a wide variety of clubs, activities and an extensive sports program.

Clubs and activities
Clubs meet every other school-day as per the six-day cycle system.

 Bible Club
 Envirothon
 Future Farmers of America (FFA)
 Future Business Leaders of America (FBLA)
 Forensics
 Junior Executive Committee
 Key Club
 Lion Buddy Mentoring
 Math Counts
 Model United Nations
 National Honor Society
 Newspaper
 Students Against Destructive Decisions (SADD)
 Scholastic Quiz
 Ski Club
 Senior Executive Committee
 Senior Production
 Service Learning Club
 Student Council
 Teens Against Tobacco Use (TATU)
 Yearbook

Athletics
 Varsity

 Boys
 Baseball - AA
 Basketball- AA
 Cross country - AA
 Football - AA
 Golf - AA
 Rifle - AAAA
 Soccer - AA
 Track and field - AA
 Wrestling - AA

 Girls
 Basketball - AA
 Cheer - AAAA
 Cross country - A
 Golf - AA
 Rifle - AAAA
 Soccer (fall) - A
 Softball - AAA
 Tennis - AA
 Track and field - AA
 Volleyball - AA

References

Public high schools in Pennsylvania
Schools in Bedford County, Pennsylvania
1972 establishments in Pennsylvania